Jayce Lee Mascarenhas-Olivero (born 2 July 1998) is a Gibraltarian footballer who plays as a defender for Europa. He is member of the Gibraltar national football team, having played at every youth level since Gibraltar joined UEFA in 2013.

Club career
Olivero is a product of the Lions Gibraltar youth academy, and broke into the team during the 2014-15 season at the age of 16. In summer 2015 he had a trial at West Ham United to gain experience of professional training. He returned to the revamped Lions team for the coming season and became a regular in the side, playing an important role as the previous season's bottom side made an early challenge for European qualification. In February 2016, he had a short trial at Leicester City, playing in a youth team game watched by scouts from other professional teams, before returning to Gibraltar. In 2016, he moved to Abingdon United for the duration of his studies. In his first season at the club, he helped them to second in the Hellenic League Division One West, and promotion. For his efforts, Olivero was voted Supporters' Player of the Season. After suffering relegation in 2019, it was announced that Olivero had signed for Europa back in Gibraltar on 15 May 2019, joining officially in time for the club's Europa League campaign. He made his debut in the 2019–20 UEFA Europa League preliminary round against UE Sant Julià on 27 June.

International career
He made his debut for the Gibraltar national football team aged 17 years and 264 days on 23 March 2016, starting in a goalless draw against Liechtenstein at the Victoria Stadium - making him the territory's youngest UEFA era player at the time until Dylan Borge broke his record in March 2021. His addition into a five-man defence by manager Jeff Wood allowed the formerly defensive Joseph Chipolina to attack. In the 69th-minute, shortly after being booked, Olivero was substituted for Jeremy Lopez. In October 2020, he was named captain for the first time, against Malta.

International statistics

Honours
Abingdon United
Hellenic Football League Division One West - Promotion: 2016–17
Supporters' Player of the Season: 2016–17
Europa
Football Gibraltar Young Player of the Season: 2019–20

References

External links

1998 births
Living people
Gibraltarian footballers
Association football defenders
Gibraltar international footballers
Gibraltarian expatriate footballers
Abingdon United F.C. players
Lions Gibraltar F.C. players
Gibraltar Premier Division players
Gibraltar under-21 international footballers
Gibraltar youth international footballers
Expatriate footballers in England
Gibraltarian expatriate sportspeople in England